Coutrot is a French surname. Notable people with the surname include:

Jacques Coutrot (1898–1965), French fencer
Jean Coutrot (1895–1941), French engineer
 (1907–1992), French politician

See also
Couvrot

French-language surnames